Robert Bonnet may refer to:

 Rob Bonnet (born 1952), BBC television journalist
 Robert Bonnet (physician) (1851–1921), German anatomist